In mathematics, a unitary transformation is a transformation that preserves the inner product: the inner product of two vectors before the transformation is equal to their inner product after the transformation.

Formal definition
More precisely, a unitary transformation is an isomorphism between two inner product spaces (such as Hilbert spaces). In other words, a unitary transformation is a bijective function

between two inner product spaces,  and  such that

Properties
A unitary transformation is an isometry, as one can see by setting  in this formula.

Unitary operator

Antiunitary transformation
A closely related notion is that of antiunitary transformation, which is a bijective function

between two complex Hilbert spaces such that 

 

See also
Antiunitary
Orthogonal transformation
Time reversal
Unitary group
Unitary operator
Unitary matrix
Wigner's theorem
Unitary transformations in quantum mechanics

Linear algebra
Functional analysis

ru:Унитарное преобразование